My Woman (stylized as MY WOMAN) is the third studio album by American singer-songwriter Angel Olsen, released on September 2, 2016 by Jagjaguwar Records. Produced by Olsen and Justin Raisen, the album was accompanied by music videos for the tracks, "Intern", "Shut Up Kiss Me", and "Sister" all co-directed or directed by Olsen.

Production

Recording
My Woman was recorded at Vox Studios in Los Angeles with producer Justin Raisen. The album was structured as sides of a vinyl record: "On one side, it’s as if you were having an upbeat day and wanted to try something a little hectic. But then, if you feel like things were slowing down and you wanted to be more reflective, then you listen to Side B." With regard to the album's themes, Olsen said that My Woman addresses "the complicated mess of being a woman."

Music
My Woman was Olsen's attempt to expand her musical style after 2014's Burn Your Fire for No Witness, with emphasis on avoiding being typecast as a lo-fi indie artist. With what she called a "plurality of voices," Olsen "wanted to use [her] vocal more and sing in the styles that [she] liked."

Compared to Olsen's previous album, My Woman contains a poppier, more diverse sound. Musical genres and musicians that influenced the album includes Fleetwood Mac, The Shirelles, Crazy Horse, 1970s glam rock, 1960s country pop and grunge. The album's opening track, "Intern," is a synthpop song that was considered to be a major departure from Olsen's previous works. Written as an experiment to "fuck with people," Olsen said of "Intern," "I have some friends who make synth music and I thought it might be fun to do something sarcastic." Critics have compared "Never Be Mine" to 1960s jangle pop and Portuguese guitar music. The album's closer, "Pops," is a piano ballad.

Promotion

Singles 
The first single from the album, "Intern," was released on June 1, 2016. A music video directed by Olsen was released the same day. On June 6, 2016, My Woman was announced. The second single from the album, "Shut Up Kiss Me," along with an accompanying Olsen-directed music video, was released on June 29. It charted on the Billboard Adult Alternative Songs chart for six weeks, peaking at position 22. The third single from the album, "Sister," along with an accompanying Olsen directed music video, was released on August 24.

Critical reception

My Woman received widespread acclaim from critics. At Metacritic, the album received an average score of 87 based on 30 professional reviews, which indicates "universal acclaim".

Pitchforks Jenn Pelly gave the album a Best New Music designation, writing "Angel Olsen's latest is her best record yet, a bracing mix of sounds and styles congealing around songs of pain, sadness, and hope." Matt Williams of The A.V. Club gave the album a grade of A−, writing "When Olsen broke through with...Burn Your Fire For No Witness...she was quickly pigeonholed as the Sad Girl...With My Woman, Olsen obliterates that narrow perception, raising the bar on her own multifaceted output and building new aspects of her artistic identity in the process." PopMatters' Colin Fitzgerald called My Woman "a new watermark for Olsen" that "elaborates on the disparate missions of both Half Way Home and Burn Your Fire for No Witness while reaching out into the unfamiliar spaces of dreamy synthpop and more hook-driven, pop-oriented songwriting." Fitzgerald added "most remarkable thing about My Woman is that it all coheres (far better than Burn Your Fire for No Witness, as great as it was, ever did) into an expansive, all-encompassing vision." Record Collector gave the album a mixed review, writing "My Woman is an odd, somewhat mismatched collection of good and then great songs that could have been more ghostly. When played simplest, or with the least traditional band structure buffeting them, they’re at their best – but it’s sadly not a constant."

In November 2016, UK record chain HMV named My Woman as its album of the year, calling it "an intuitively smart, warmly communicative and fearlessly generous record".

Accolades

Track listing

Charts

Personnel
The following people contributed to My Woman:
	Angel Olsen 	-	vocals, inside photo, producer 
	Chris Allgood 	-	assistant 
	Stewart Bronaugh 	-	main personnel 
	Collin Dupuis 	-	mixing 
	Emily Elhaj 	 	-	main personnel 
	Michael Harris 	-	engineer 
	Joshua Jaeger 	 	-	main personnel 
	Miles Johnson 	-	design 
	Seth Kauffman 	 	-	main personnel 
	Emily Lazar 	-	mastering 
	Amanda Marsalis 	-	cover photo, inside photo 
	Lisa Nance 	-	cover painting 
	Justin Raisen 	-	engineer, main personnel, producer 
	Lawrence Rothman 	-	additional production

References

2016 albums
Angel Olsen albums
Jagjaguwar albums
Albums produced by Justin Raisen
Albums recorded at Electro-Vox Recording Studios